In Gallo-Roman religion, Bricta or Brixta was a Gaulish goddess who was a consort of Luxovius, god of the waters of Luxeuil-les-Bains (in antiquity, Luxovium). Nicholson (1999), has suggested however that if "Bricta is a title incorporating Bríg, it may actually be a title assigned to Sirona rather than a separate goddess".

Inscriptions
Bricta is recorded in the following inscriptions from Luxeuil-les-Bains :

[Lus]soio / et Brictae / Divixti/us Cons/tans / v(otum) s(olvit) <l=T>(ibens) m(erito)
"To Lusso(v)ios and Bricta, Divixtius Constans freely and deservedly fulfilled his vow." (CIL 13, 05425)

Luxovio / et Brixtae / G(aius) Iul(ius) Fir/manus / v(otum) s(olvit) l(ibens) m(erito)
"To Luxovios and Brixta, Gaius Julius Firmans freely and deservedly fulfilled his vow." 
(AE 1951, 00231; CIL 13, 05426)

Etymology

This Gaulish theonym is derived from the word brixtom or brixta meaning magic. The word also appears on the inscription of Chamalières. (Delamarre pp. 76–77 with references and comparative etymology)

References

Année Epigraphique; volume 1951.
Corpus Inscriptionum Latinarum (CIL), volume 13, Tres Galliae.
 Delamarre, X. (2003). Dictionnaire de la Langue Gauloise. 2nd edition. Paris, Editions Errance. 

 

Gaulish goddesses
Water goddesses